Oscillatoria is a genus of filamentous cyanobacterium which is often found in freshwater environments, such as hot springs, and appears blue-green. Its name refers to the oscillating motion of its filaments as they slide against each other to position the colony facing a light source. Oscillatoria reproduces by fragmentation, facilitated by dead cells which separate a filament into separate sections, or hormogonia, which then grow. Oscillatoria uses photosynthesis to survive and reproduce. Each filament of oscillatoria consists of trichome which is made up of rows of cells. The tip of the trichome oscillates like a pendulum. In reproduction, it takes place by vegetative means only. Usually the filament breaks into a number of fragments called hormogonia. Each hormogonium consist of one or more cells and grow into a filament by cell division in one direction.

Oscillatoria are the subject of research into the natural production of butylated hydroxytoluene (BHT), an antioxidant, food additive and industrial chemical. 

Cyclic peptides called venturamides, which may have anti-malarial activity, have been isolated from bacteria in this genus. They are the first peptides with this activity to have been found in cyanobacteria.

Species 
Oscillatoria contains the following species:

Oscillatoria amoena (Kützing) Gomont
Oscillatoria anguiformis (P. González Guerrero) Anagnostidis
Oscillatoria anguina Bory ex Gomont
Oscillatoria annae van Goor
Oscillatoria bonnemaisonii (P. L. Crouan & H. M. Crouan) P. L. Crouan & H. M. Crouan ex Gomont
Oscillatoria brevis Kützing ex Gomont
Ocillatoria chalybea Mertens ex Gomont
Oscillatoria chilkensis Biswas
Oscillatoria crassa (Rao) Anagnostidis
Oscillatoria croasdaleae Kamat
Oscillatoria curviceps C. Agardh ex Gomont
Oscillatoria depauperata (Copeland) Anagnostidis
Oscillatoria engelmanniana Gaidukov
Oscillatoria euboeica Anagnostidis
Oscillatoria fischeri Corda ex Forti
Oscillatoria fracta Carlson
Oscillatoria froelichii Kützing ex Gomont
Oscillatoria funiformis (Vouk) Komárek
Oscillatoria indica P. C. Silva
Oscillatoria jenensis G. Schmid
Oscillatoria levis (Gardner) Anagnostidis
Oscillatoria limosa C. Agardh ex Gomont
Oscillatoria limnetica Lemmermann
Oscillatoria mahabaleshwarensis Kamat
Oscillatoria major Vaucher ex Hansgirg
Oscillatoria margaritifera Kützing ex Gomont
Oscillatoria miniata (Zanardini) Hauck ex Gomont
Oscillatoria minutissima P. González
Oscillatoria muralis (Dillwyn) C. Agardh
Oscillatoria nitida Schkorbatov
Oscillatoria nylstromica Claassen
Oscillatoria obscura Brühl & Biswas
Oscillatoria olivaceobrunnea L. Hoffmann & V. Demoulin
Oscillatoria princeps Vaucher ex Gomont
Oscillatoria proboscidea Gomont
Oscillatoria pulchra Lindstedt
Oscillatoria rhamphoidea Anagnostidis
Oscillatoria ribeyi F. E. Drouet
Oscillatoria rubescens De Candolle ex Gomont
Oscillatoria sancta Kützing ex Gomont
Oscillatoria subbrevis Schmidle
Oscillatoria subcapitata Ponomarev
Oscillatoria tapetiformis Zenker ex Gomont
Oscillatoria tenioides (Bory de Saint-Vincent) Bory de Saint-Vincent ex Gomont
Oscillatoria trichoides Szafer
Oscillatoria versicolor G. Martens ex Prain
Oscillatoria willei N. L. Gardner

References

 http://faculty.mdc.edu/jmorata/Slide%20Study%20Gyomamauide.pdf

External links
https://web.archive.org/web/20160304055858/http://133.25.19.145/pdb/images/Prokaryotes/Oscillatoriaceae/Oscillatoria/index.html

Oscillatoriales
Cyanobacteria genera